Helene Turner (sometimes credited as Helen Turner) was an American film editor who worked in the industry for over 30 years, beginning during the silent era.

For part of her career, she worked as a cutter at Florida's Sun Haven Studios. There was also a period where she was employed by Paramount. She received a writing credit on the 1958 film noir Hong Kong Affair. She was noted for cutting a number of serials for Republic.

Selected filmography 

 The Cosmic Man (1959)
 Hong Kong Affair (1958)
 The Cool and the Crazy (1958)
 The Delinquents (1957)
 Huk! (1956)
 Attila (1954)
 Secret Evidence (1941)
 The Carson City Kid (1940)
 Hi-Yo Silver (1940)
 The Lone Ranger Rides Again (1939)
 Child Bride (1938)
 The Painted Stallion (1937)
 Dick Tracy (1937)
 Zorro Rides Again (1937)
 Undersea Kingdom (1936)
 Just My Luck (1935)
 Chloe, Love Is Calling You (1934)
 Hired Wife (1934)
 Playthings of Desire (1933)
 Secrets of a Secretary (1931)
 Honor Among Lovers (1931)
 Laughter (1930)
 Dangerous Nan McGrew (1930)
 Roadhouse Nights (1929)
 The Lady Lies (1929)

References

External links 

 

American women film editors
American film editors
Year of birth missing
Year of death missing